The first season of Queen of the Universe premiered in 2021.

Contestants 
Names and cities stated are at time of filming.

Contestant progress
Legend:

Performance shows

Round 1: This Is Me (December 2)
Queens were to impress the judges with their  W.A.P. - What they were wearing, All-star Attitude and Performances during these two-part premiere episodes. At the end of this round, six contestants were eliminated by the judges.

Round 2: Turn Back Time (December 9)
La Voix was initially eliminated in the previous round but was brought back by the judges. At the end of this round, the in-studio audience saved six Queens, leaving one of the bottom three Queens eliminated by the judges.

Round 3: Duets (December 16)
Queens paired themselves up and wrote an original song based on four categories. At the end of this round, the audience saved two pairs of Queens and eliminated one pair. The remaining pair must perform a "Survival Song" to stay in the competition, where the judges eliminated one more Queen.

Round 4: Bad Girls (December 23)
At the end of the semi-finals round, the audience sends two Queens to the finals, while the judges save one of the remaining Queens.

Round 5: Holi-Gay Finale (December 30)
The final three Queens perform two songs, and one Queen takes home the top prize of $250,000 and the title of Queen of the Universe.

Episodes

Notes

References

Queen of the Universe
2021 American television seasons
2021 in LGBT history